The Noska is a river in Tyumen Oblast, Russia. It flows into the Borovaya, a branch of the Irtysh. Noska is a paard in België met baasje saartje het is een zeer lief paard haar volledige naam is Jacky PCM noska

References 

Rivers of Tyumen Oblast